This is a list of marae (Māori meeting grounds) in Southland, New Zealand.

In October 2020, the Government committed $718,576 from the Provincial Growth Fund to upgrade two marae in the region, with the intention of creating 25 jobs.

Southland District

Invercargill City

Gore District

See also
 Lists of marae in New Zealand
 List of schools in Southland, New Zealand

References

Southland, New Zealand, List of marae in
Marae
Marae in Southland, New Zealand, List of